Disney Television Animation (DTVA), formerly known as Walt Disney Pictures Television Animation Group and Walt Disney Television Animation, is the television animation production arm of Disney Branded Television, a sub-division of the Disney Entertainment division of The Walt Disney Company established on December 5, 1984, by Gary Krisel during the reorganization and subsequent re-incorporation of The Walt Disney Company following the arrival of then-Disney CEO Michael Eisner.

The division is responsible for creating, developing and producing animation-oriented television series, films, specials and short films for broadcast predominantly on the 3 main Disney-branded networks; Disney Channel, Disney XD and Disney Junior, as well as Disney+.

History

Background 
The Walt Disney Company first ventured into the television industry as early as 1950, beginning with the one-hour Christmas special, One Hour in Wonderland.
This was followed by the 1951 Christmas special, The Walt Disney Christmas Show, the long-running (1954–2008) anthology series, The Wonderful World of Disney (which was Disney's first regular series as a whole), the children's variety show The Mickey Mouse Club, and the adventure series, Zorro (1957–1959).

However, one element was missing from Disney's expansion into television: An original animated television series.  Until the early '80s, the studio had never produced its own original animated shows in-house, because Walt Disney felt it was economically impossible.  Nearly all pre-1985 TV animation was wrap-around segments made to bridge the gaps on existing theatrical material on The Wonderful World of Disney. Osamu Tezuka met Walt at the 1964 World's Fair, at which time Disney said he hoped to "make something just like" Tezuka's Astro Boy someday, but unfortunately, nothing came of it.

1984–1990: Early Beginnings 
The hiring of a new CEO for Walt Disney Productions in 1984, Michael Eisner, lead him to push to expand Disney into new areas thus the establishment of a television animation division that year, whose output would be shopped to all markets: networks, Disney Channel and syndication. Eisner held a meeting at his home in which he brought up the concept of doing a series on the Gummi bear as his kids like the candy. Originally, the staff was told that they could not use the principal Disney cartoon characters in the new shows.

The Walt Disney Television Animation department was started in November 1984 with Gary Krisel as president and Michael Webster as senior vice president.

This was considered a risky move because animated TV series was generally considered low-budget investments for most of the history of TV cartoons up through the 1980s.
Many critics say that Disney's own animation studio had lost most of its luster during the period from Walt Disney's passing in the 1960s through the 1980s. However, the studio took several risks that paid off handsomely. The studio successfully gambled on the idea that a substantially larger investment into quality animation could be made back through both network television and over-the-air in syndication, as well as cable. The final result is a string of higher budgeted animated television productions which proved to be profitable ventures and raised the standard for the TV medium.

The first productions to make it to air from the studio arrived in 1985, with Eisner's concept fleshed out into Adventures of the Gummi Bears, joined by an original concept The Wuzzles, both which are based upon talking animal-based conceptions. The third series in a similar vein, Fluppy Dogs, was produced as a single hour-long TV movie pilot that aired on ABC on Thanksgiving 1986 and was loosely based a series of children's books and line of toys about a race of anthropomorphic pastel-colored dimension-hopping alien called "fluppy dogs." Dismal viewership ensured the project never made it to series.

In 1987, Disney finally unveiled the newest series yet in its cycle, and the first in their successful long-time line of syndicated animated shows, DuckTales. Though forbidden from using the star characters, minor characters such as Scrooge McDuck and Huey, Dewey and Louie were allowed, and Disney did concede to allow for a brief appearance by Donald Duck to establish the series, allowing them to adapt the Duck universe adventure serials by Carl Barks into animation. The show was successful enough to spawn a feature film, DuckTales the Movie: Treasure of the Lost Lamp, and two spin-off series: Darkwing Duck and Quack Pack. 1990 release Treasure of the Lost Lamp was the first movie from TV Animation Disney MovieToon unit. Disney Television Animation hired a director of specials, Sharon Morrill, in 1993.

1990–2003: Broadcast Networks & Syndication era

The Disney Afternoon 

The success of DuckTales also paved the way for a new wave of high-quality animated TV series, including Disney's own The New Adventures of Winnie the Pooh in 1988. Later, early that spring, Chip 'n Dale Rescue Rangers debuted on March 4, 1989, and was paired with DuckTales in an hour-long syndicated show through the 1989-1990 television season. In the 1990–1991 season, Disney expanded the idea even further, to create The Disney Afternoon, a two-hour-long syndicated block of half-hour cartoons, which premiered much later on September 10, 1990. DuckTales was one of the early flagship cartoons in the block.

On August 24, 1994, with Jeffrey Katzenberg's resignation, Richard Frank became head of newly formed Walt Disney Television and Telecommunications (WDTT), which included WDTA, from units of The Walt Disney Studios. Morrill was in charge of the first Aladdin DTV sequel launching Disney Video Premiere/Direct to Video unit.

Three overseas Disney studios were set up to produce the company's animated television series. Disney Animation Australia was started in 1988. In 1989, the Brizzi brothers sold Brizzi Films to Disney Television Animation and was renamed Walt Disney Animation France. Also that year, Disney Animation Japan was started. Walt Disney Animation Canada was opened in January 1996 to tap Canada's animator pool and produce direct-to-video. As direct-to-video increased in importance, the overseas studios moved to making feature films.

WDTT chair Frank left Disney in March 1995. With Krisel expecting to be promoted to head up WDTT but passed over, Krisel left WDTA at the end of his contract in January 1996. At the time the Walt Disney Company merged with Capital Cities/ABC, TV Animation was a unit of Walt Disney Television within the Walt Disney Television and Telecommunications group (WDTT). With the retirement of WDTT group president Dennis Hightower in April 1996 and ongoing post-merger reorganization, the unit (along with its Disney TV parent) was transferred to the Walt Disney Studios.

One Saturday Morning/ABC Kids & One Too 

When the September 1, 1997 season started, the block dropped The Disney Afternoon (temporally rebranded as the "Disney-Kellogg Alliance"), moving shows to Disney Channel. On September 13, 1997, Disney's ABC unit launched Disney's One Saturday Morning. The programming block included several new shows, such as 101 Dalmatians, Recess, Pepper Ann, Disney's Doug, and Mickey Mouse Works.

In January 1998, Disney also reached a deal to program a new children's block for UPN, Disney's One Too, to replace that network's internal UPN Kids block. The syndicated block ran until the debut of One Too on September 6, 1999; which aired mainly the same shows as One Saturday Morning.

By April 1998, Disney MovieToons was folded in with Walt Disney Video Premieres films and network TV specials of Disney TV Animation as Morrill moved to executive vice president over her pre-existing units. At the same time, Barry Blumberg was elevated to the executive vice president for network and syndicated animated TV series. Both reported to Disney Television president Charles Hirschhorn.

In the second quarter of 2000, due to weak financial performance, Disney Animation Canada was closed. David Stainton took charge of the company as executive vice president in January 2000 then as president in February 2002 under Thomas Schumacher.

Due to the reconstruction, Disney & ABC also rebranded its One Saturday Morning block to ABC Kids (a subtle tribute to the Fox Kids brand after being acquired by Disney through its purchase of Fox Family Worldwide in 2001) on September 14, 2002. On August 31, 2003, Disney discontinued the One Too block, thus ending their deal with UPN.

After the relaunch as ABC Kids, many of the shows' premieres moved to sister network Toon Disney due to schedule constraints. The remaining shows included: The Weekenders, Teacher's Pet, House of Mouse, Lloyd in Space, Teamo Supremo, and Fillmore!. All new episodes finished airing by 2004, allowing the network to switch to syndicating promotions for new original shows for Disney Channel and upcoming Jetix brand (which held the previous Fox Kids library).

2003–2017: As a division of Disney Channel 

In January 2003, Disney initiated a reorganization of its theatrical and animation units to improve resource usage and continued focus on new characters and franchise development. Disney then transferred all Television Animation to Disney Channels Worldwide. In this reorganization, the Disney MovieToons/Disney Video Premieres unit move from Television Animation to Feature Animation. The studio was then renamed Disneytoon Studios. While Stainton took over as President of Disney Feature Animation from Schumacher, Blumberg returned to WDTVA as president. Kim Possible became the first cartoon produced by Disney Channel (as Jambalaya Studio produced The Proud Family for the network).

Following the company's new shift in focus, in 2004, Disney formed a joint-venture with Jetix Europe N.V. labeled "Jetix Animation Concepts" to produce original shows worldwide. The three series include: Super Robot Monkey Team Hyperforce Go!, Get Ed, and Yin Yang Yo!. Along with four produced by SIP Animation: The Tofus, W.I.T.C.H., A.T.O.M., and Combo Niños. Jetix would typically air as a block on Toon Disney (and sister network ABC Family until August 31, 2006) in the U.S., or as channel internationally (depending on the region).

Throughout the 2000s, Disney continued to create new animated Disney Channel (& Playhouse Disney) Originals such as Lilo & Stitch: The Series, Dave the Barbarian, Brandy & Mr. Whiskers, Mickey Mouse Clubhouse, My Friends Tigger & Pooh, and The Emperor's New School were in already in production. At this point, animated series would have to be produced solely by the network's animation division. So Disney Channel began experimenting with newer animation techniques to reduce costs under the re-established Disney Channels Worldwide.

The Buzz on Maggie was among the first Disney series to fully utilize Adobe Flash animation, thus saving costs and allowing experimentation. American Dragon: Jake Long (which premiered just months prior) and The Replacements received cleaner redesigns for their second seasons (noteworthy, as both series originated as their creator's storybooks) to ease the animation styles for fitting TV budgets. The success of Kim Possible also helped show that there was marketing value in Disney Channel cartoons as the network ordered a fourth season (opposed to the standard three seasons of 65 episodes). Disney soon launched Phineas and Ferb soon after the closure of Kim Possible (which surpassed it as their longest-running animated series).

In 2009, Disney–ABC Television Group rebranded both Toon Disney and Jetix as Disney XD with the Jetix brand officially being retired by 2010. The goal was to simplify the marketing of channels by merging the two brands. In 2011, the ABC Kids block closed as well. By the early 2010s, the television group started to create some original shows for newly sister channel Disney XD. The group renamed the animation studio to just Disney Television Animation (or DTVA). Playhouse Disney was rebranded as Disney Junior in 2011 and receiving standalone channels in 2012; by replacing Soapnet (domestically) and the Jetix Play channels (internationally).

Kick Buttowski: Suburban Daredevil became the first Disney XD original animated show preceding Disney Channel's Fish Hooks. The following Disney XD cartoons were Motorcity, Tron Uprising, Randy Cunningham: 9th Grade Ninja, and Penn Zero: Part-Time Hero. All of which were co-produced by other animation resources except for The 7D (which was originally greenlit for Disney Junior). Despite still making original shows for the main channel by 2014, most animated shows such as Gravity Falls and Wander Over Yonder shifted as Disney XD Originals. Mickey Mouse, Descendants: Wicked World, and Tangled: The Series remained the only shows not moved to the sister channel.

2017–present: Animation resurgence and Expansion 
In 2016, Disney XD greenlit Big City Greens (then titled: Country Club); however, production had to be on hold due to the abundance of DTVA shows at the time. Disney had just announced Milo Murphy's Law for Disney XD that same year, along with a reboot of DuckTales as early as 2015.

However, to renovate marketing, Disney ceased production of all original shows for Disney XD. The last shows created were Pickle and Peanut (creator as Fish Hooks), Future-Worm! and Billy Dilley's Super-Duper Subterranean Summer were all announced (as early as 2014) but would air in the sequential years.

Since 2017, the studio quietly started a collaboration with Walt Disney Imagineering, Disney Parks, Experiences and Products and Disney Cruise Line on providing different redesings,animations and theming for attractions and night-time shows for Disneyland, Walt Disney World, Disney Resorts and Disney Cruises based on the different series around the different productions of the studio within the Mickey Mouse universe starting with Mickey & Minnie's Runaway Railway in 2020 and continuing with Aqua-Mouse for Disney Wish and DuckTales: World Showcase Adventure for EPCOT in 2022 and providing help with the Mickey's Toontown refreshment for 2023.

In early 2018, Disney Channels Worldwide officially announced to return animated to the main Disney Channel. This change meant that DTVA would mainly only be producing shows for Disney Channel and Disney Junior.

In February of that year, the studio pitched two new shows Amphibia and The Owl House, to mark their return to animation. Big City Greens (initially intended to air on Disney XD) switched to Disney Channel. The remaining solely-produced shows by the studio, such as Star vs. the Forces of Evil, DuckTales, Big Hero 6: The Series, and Milo Murphy's Law, moved their premieres as well, with many of their productions being wrapped up.

In early 2019, the studio opened a new sub-division under the name "Disney Television Animation Multiplatform Content", the goal of this division is the creation of interstitial animated content for Disney Junior and Disney Channel based on the characters within the multiple productions of the studio like Mickey Mornings,Shake Your Tail with Chip 'n Dale,a revival of Minnie's Bow Toons & Me & Mickey Vlog for Disney Junior and Chibi Tiny Tales,Broken Karaoke,Random Rings,Theme Song Takeover & How Not To Draw for Disney Channel. Since 2020, the division has also been used by Disney to be a cross-promotion for multiple live action film franchises produced by Disney Branded Television within the Disney Channel Original Movies and Disney+ Original Films banner as well making shorts based on the live action film franchises from the Walt Disney Studios library, shorts based on the multiple rides and attractions from Walt Disney World and Disneyland and shorts based on the library from Walt Disney Animation Studios.

In Summer 2019, long-time Disney Television Animation CEO Eric Coleman quietly left the studio to become development executive CEO at Illumination, Coleman CEO role was replaced by former general manager of DisneyToon Studios Meredith Roberts who served as senior VP animation strategy at Disney TVA since the shut down of Disney Toon Studios on 2018. In mid-2019, the studio quietly inherited the former Disney Toon Studios building as a third animation unit for future productions. In July, 2019 Disney TV Animation signed 17 creators and animators to overall deals. This venture follows a trend in kid programming started by Netflix, more creators and artists will ink overall development deals in sequential years.

In 2019, Disney greenlit another new show, The Ghost and Molly McGee (originally titled: The Curse of Molly McGee) and Moon Girl and Devil Dinosaur (a co-production with corporate sister studio Marvel Animation). Many following Disney Junior original shows have rebranded as "Disney Junior" instead of merely "Disney", mainly used for Disney Channel shows. However, Disney+ original shows would remain a separate brand.

Late 2021 and early 2022 saw several changes in management at Disney TVA, with former Blue Sky Studios executive Lisa Fragner joining as vice-president of development for Disney+ in November 2021, alongside longtime Disney TVA executive Elizabeth Waybright Taylor, who was also promoted as vice-president of development the same month. Fragner would oversee development on projects for Disney+, while Taylor would supervise Disney Channel projects. In February 2022, Sarah Finn was promoted to senior vice-president of production, overseeing physical production for projects across all three Disney networks, after working on the studio ever since 2018. On July 22, 2022, Douglas Bensimon and Edward Mejia were both promoted to VP of current series; Bensimon will oversee development on original series,while Mejia will work on series based on preexisting Disney IP.

In February 2022, it was reported that Disney TVA is working on an animated film titled Superfudge alongside AGBO for Disney+. The studio is also developing a film titled School for Sensitive Souls as part of former Disney Branded Television president Gary Marsh's new overall deal with Disney. In November 2021 it was revealed that as part of Lisa Fragner's promotion as CEO of development at Disney TVA, that the animated feature film adaptation of Confessions Of An Imaginary Friend originally acquired by 20th Century Animation by Fragner on 2015 went back to production at Disney TVA. They will be among Disney TVA's first original films ever since the failed Fluppy Dogs pilot film.

In March 2022, The studio announced that it will collaborate with adult-animation-orientated sister studio 20th Television Animation, for the creation of young adult animated series, mini-series and movies for Disney+ starting with the animated stop-motion-musical comedy Rhona Who Lives By The River.

0n May 4, 2022, Disney Television Animation begun production on its 100th Series overall, Cookies & Milk, produced by Cinema Gypsy Productions & Jesse James Films.

On June 2022, Disney Television Animation CEO Meredith Roberts was promoted as Executive Vice President of Animation across all animation units at Disney Branded Television with Roberts overseeing development and greenlight projects at Disney TVA, Disney Junior and sister studios like Disney Europe Animation and 20th Television Animation.

In November 2022, Alyssa Sapire got promoted to lead all content for Disney Junior, as part of the announcement, Sapire also solidified her senior executive team across development and current with Kim Berglund promoted as vice president of Development of Disney Junior for the studio with oversight of all series, specials and shorts in development and Diane Ikemiyashiro and Lori Mozilo handling current series as vice-presidents on Disney Junior at the studio also working closely with partners across The Walt Disney Company on development with upcoming preschool series based on IPs from Walt Disney Animation Studios, Pixar, 20th Century Family and 20th Century Animation.

In February 2023 as part of The Walt Disney Company's strategic restructuring from CEO Bob Iger, it was announced that Dana Walden as part of co-leading the newly appointed Disney Entertainment division will oversee the Disney Branded Television and Disney Television Animation units alongside Ayo Davis, Meredith Roberts and Alyssa Sapire. Later that month Walden announced that the president of ABC Entertainment, Hulu Originals & Disney Branded Television Streaming Originals Craig Erwich will expand his role with overseeing the development and original programming of Disney Channel and Disney Junior with Davis, Roberts and Sapire. Walden promoted Davis to oversight executive of development and current at Disney Channel, Disney Junior and Disney+ with Erwich across It's A Laugh Productions and Disney Television Animation.

Filmography

See also 

 Disney General Entertainment Content, the parent unit for Disney's television and streaming operations.
Walt Disney Animation Japan, former subsidiary of DTVA
Disneytoon Studios
Jetix Animation Concepts, former international joint-venture between DTVA and Jetix Europe
 20th Television Animation 
 List of Disney television series
 Cartoon Network Studios
 Hanna-Barbera Studios Europe
 Williams Street
 Warner Bros. Animation
 Nickelodeon Animation Studio
 MTV Animation
 DreamWorks Animation Television
 Universal Animation Studios

References

Sources
 Cotter, Bill, The Wonderful World of Disney Television: A Complete History, California: Disney Editions, 1997,

External links
  
 
 
 

 
American animation studios
Disney production studios
Disney Media Networks
Disney Channel
Television production companies of the United States
American companies established in 1984
Companies based in Glendale, California
1984 establishments in California
Mass media companies established in 1984